is a 54-story mixed-use skyscraper in Roppongi, Minato, Tokyo. Completed in 2003 and named after builder Minoru Mori, it is the centerpiece of the Roppongi Hills urban development. The tower has a floor space area of 379,408 square meters (4,083,910 sq ft), making it one of the largest buildings in the world by this measure.

The Mori Tower building is primarily used for office space, but it also includes retail stores, restaurants and other attractions. The Mori Art Museum is located on the 53rd floor and visitors can view the city from observation decks on the 52nd and 54th floors. The headquarters of Mori Building Company are located in this building.

Facilities
Mori Tower is a mixed-use facility that is used for retail and office space. The tower's first six floors house retail stores and restaurants.

Mori Arts Center and Art Museum

The Mori Arts Center is located on floors 49–54. This center includes various tourist attractions spread over the tower's top six floors. Two members-only facilities—a library and a private club—are located on floors 49 and 51, respectively. Visitors are provided with views of the city at Tokyo City View on the 52nd floor and an open-air roof deck on the 54th floor.

Opening in October 2003, the Mori Art Museum is the centerpiece of the Mori Arts Center. Its interior was designed by Gluckman Mayner Architects, and it originally occupied the entire 53rd floor as well as a portion of the 52nd floor. The museum's galleries on the 52nd floor have since been removed, however. British-born David Elliott served as the museum's director until he resigned in late 2006, and Fumio Nanjo assumed the position. The museum is one of the only venues in Tokyo with a percentage of foreign visitors comparable to the Tokyo National Museum, but it attracts fewer visitors in total.

Office tenants

Floors 7–48 serve as office space and house various corporate tenants, including:

Airbus Japan K.K. (35F)
Allen & Overy (38F)
Apple Inc. (36F)
Barclays Bank and Barclays Capital (32F - 33F)
Booz & Company (27F)
BASF (21F)
CIBC (15F)
Goldman Sachs (42F, 45F - 48F)
Expedia Japan and HomeAway Japan (31F)
Google Japan (26F - 30F, 43F - 44F)
GREE, Inc. (8F - 9F, 11F - 14F)
Lenovo Japan Ltd. (18F)
McKinsey & Company (9F - 10F)
Mercari (15F, 18F, 25F, 43F)
Morgan, Lewis & Bockius (24F)
Nokia Networks (29F)
TMI Associates and Simmons & Simmons (23F)
The Pokémon Company corporate headquarters (18F)
Riot Games (34F)

Since the opening of Tokyo Midtown's Midtown Tower in 2007, former Mori Tower tenants such as Konami and Yahoo! Japan have relocated to the new tower. Prior to its bankruptcy, Lehman Brothers occupied the space currently occupied by Barclays.

Incidents

2004 fatality

While on a tour of Mori Tower on the morning of 26 March 2004, six-year-old Ryo Mizokawa was killed in a revolving door at the building's second-floor main entrance. Mizokawa's head was crushed between the door rotating from his left and the outer frame; he died two hours after reaching the hospital. After the incident, it was revealed that 32 people had previously sustained injuries caused by revolving doors at Roppongi Hills since the complex opened less than a year earlier. In September of the same year, in an out-of-court settlement, the Mizokawa family received a compensation payment of approximately 70 million yen from the building's operator, Mori Building Company. This sum was approximately equivalent to the cost of two doors of the type that caused the fatality.

In March 2005, prosecutors indicted three people on charges of professional negligence resulting in death: senior Mori Building Co. executives Yuzo Tada and Yukihiro Koyama and an executive from the revolving door's manufacturer, Sanwa Tajima Corporation, Hisanobu Kubo. Prosecutors argued that the Mori Building officials did not implement safety measures proposed after previous incidents because they would detract from the tower's entrance appearance. All three pleaded guilty to the charges, and in September they received three-year suspended prison sentences of 10 months, 10 months and 14 months, respectively.

2007 fire
On 4 April 2007, an elevator system in Mori Tower produced a fire that destroyed part of the tower's lift-motor room and forced hundreds of people to evacuate the building. According to the elevator's manufacturer, Otis Elevator Company, a frayed cable scraping surrounding lift system components produced enough sparks to ignite a fire. After the fire, it was discovered that Otis was aware of rusted and frayed cables in the tower's elevator systems since January 2005. The incident spawned nationwide inspections of Japanese elevators by both Nippon Otis and the Land, Infrastructure and Transport Ministry. The ministry inspection of approximately 260,000 elevators turned up problems in 813 elevators.

Livedoor incident
In January 2006, one of the building's tenants, livedoor, a Japanese internet service provider, was raided by police. The incident resulted in the arrests of two executives and the company has since relocated its headquarters.

See also

List of tallest buildings and structures in Tokyo

References

External links

Roppongi Hills official site
Mori Art Museum official site

Skyscraper office buildings in Tokyo
Office buildings completed in 2003
Buildings and structures in Minato, Tokyo
Roppongi
Retail buildings in Tokyo
Kohn Pedersen Fox buildings
2003 establishments in Japan
Mori Building
Ove Arup buildings and structures